Euphorbia mellifera, the Canary spurge or honey spurge, is a species of flowering plant in the spurge family Euphorbiaceae, native to Madeira and the Canary Islands. In spring it produces brown, honey-scented flowers.

The Latin specific epithet mellifera means "producing honey".

It has gained the Royal Horticultural Society's Award of Garden Merit.  Euphorbia × pasteurii is listed as a hybrid between E. mellifera and E. stygiana. The cultivars 'Phrampton Phatty', 'Roundway Titan'  and 'John Phillips'  have received the RHS AGM.

Like all euphorbias, this plant contains a milky-white sap, which oozes out of the stems when cut.  This can be a skin irritant and is very harmful to the eyes. Gloves should be worn when pruning,

References

mellifera
Flora of the Canary Islands
Flora of Madeira
Endemic flora of Macaronesia